Shantheyanda Veena Achayya (born 6 October 1961) is an Indian politician and member of the Karnataka Legislative Council from the Indian National Congress. She was a former president of the Kodagu District Congress Committee, while also having served as the president of the Kodagu Zilla Panchayat.

Political career 
In June 2016, Achaiah was elected to the Karnataka Legislative Council, securing 31 votes of Indian National Congress members of the legislative assembly.

References 

1961 births
Living people
Members of the Karnataka Legislative Council
Indian National Congress politicians from Karnataka